Rise of the Planet of the Apes (Original Motion Picture Soundtrack) is the score album to the 2011 film Rise of the Planet of the Apes, a reboot of the Planet of the Apes film franchise. The film's original score is composed by Patrick Doyle, and was released by Varèse Sarabande on August 9, 2011.

Development 
The score for the film was written by Patrick Doyle and performed by the Hollywood Studio Symphony conducted by James Shearman. On being compared to the musical works of Jerry Goldsmith and Danny Elfman, who scored the previous instalment, and its impact on the tonal and primitive quality, Doyle opined that the musical approach would be fresh. The main concern was to have the music help progress the plot in the scenes without dialogue, for instance, conveying the emotions of Caesar's relationships with Will and Charles. To turn the score into a "driving force that keeps audiences paying attention," Doyle employed an African-American chorus and focused on percussion and "low and deep" orchestra sounds. Doyle collaborated closely with the sound department to make the music complement the sound effects, including writing a recurring theme based on their recording of a chimpanzee.

Reception 
James Southall of Movie Wave wrote "While this is undoubtedly the most mainstream of all the Apes scores, it’s also arguably the only one which attempts to give a real emotional arc to the apes themselves.  The album isn’t consistently outstanding – a few tracks I haven’t mentioned in my commentary above don’t really add too much – but is quite a thrill ride, proving Patrick Doyle’s more than got the chops to play at the top table even in modern action movies." Sean Wilson of Mfiles wrote "It's immensely satisfying to note that even on a major Hollywood score such as this, Doyle's voice can still shine through. It's a testament to his skills as a composer but director Rupert Wyatt must also be applauded for allowing the composer to maintain his musical personality, even under the vast weight of expectation. Doyle has always been one of the most sensitive composers in the business, and by balancing the score's modern trappings with the sense of beauty for which he is renowned, ensures Rise of the Planet of the Apes is yet another winning score for 2011. Much like Thor, it demands repeat listening but rewards those willing to go the distance."

Filmtracks.com wrote "Some listeners will find too much of Rise of the Planet of the Apes to be similarly generic in its catering to blockbuster norms, but listen more carefully to Doyle's complexities and you will be rewarded. The thematic development, while very strong, is not quite pleasing enough in its obvious placements to give this score the highest rating. It stands as a strong sibling to Thor, however, and proves that the humble and humorous Scot is certainly more than capable of handling these kinds of assignments." James Christopher Monger of AllMusic wrote "Doyle, who comes from the Hanz Zimmer and Harry Gregson-Williams school of big and bold and percussive action cues, allows little space for the reboot to breathe, yet his themes are consistently thrilling, rarely devolving into the kind of generic, tuneless smorgasbord of kettle drums and dissonant keyboard strings that so often pass for 21st century summer blockbuster fare." Peter Debruge of Variety said that Doyle's "insistent score clearly sympathizes with the pic's climactic ape uprising". David Edelstein of Vulture wrote Doyle's "typically stupendous score sweeps aside the absurdities"

Track listing

Personnel 
Credits adapted from CD liner notes.

 Producer – Maggie Rodford, Patrick Doyle
 Programming – Rupert Cross, Roger Suen, Sam Bohn
 Recording – Alan Meyerson, Joel Iwataki, Kevin Globerman, Vincent Cirilli, Tim Lauber
 Score editing – Chris Benstead, Jeanette Surga, Joseph Bonn
 Mastering – Andrew Walter
 Mixing – Patrick Spain, Joel Iwataki
 Musical assistance – Jerome Pangelinan
 Music supervisor – Patrick Houlihan
 Music contractor – Gina Zimmitti
 Vocals contractor – Jasper Randall
 Music preparation – 'Note That Score'
 Executive producer – Robert Townson
 Instruments
 Bass – Bruce Morgenthaler, Drew Dembowski, Ed Meares, Frances Liu Wu, Oscar Hidalgo, Sue Ranney
 Bassoon – Ken Munday, Rose Corrigan
 Cello – Tony Cooke, Cecilia Tsan, Dennis Karmazyn, Giovanna Clayton, Steve Erdody, Tim Landauer, Tim Loo, Trevor Handy
 Clarinet – Don Foster, Ralph Williams, Stuart Clark
 Flute – Heather Clark, Steve Kujala, Pedro Eustache
 Oboe – Leslie Reed, Phil Ayling
 Percussion – Bob Zimmitti, Alex Acuña, Bob Zimmitti, Luis Conte, Mike Fisher
 Piano – Randy Kerber
 Trombone – Alex Iles, Bill Reichenbach, Steve Holtman
 Trumpet – Jon Lewis, Marissa Benedict, Rick Baptist
 Tuba – Doug Tornquist
 Viola – Andrew Duckles, Brian Dembow, David Walther, Keith Greene, Matt Funes, Shawn Mann, Thomas Diener, Vicky Miskolczy
 Violin – Alan Grunfeld, Alyssa Park, Barbra Porter, Charlie Bisharat, Darius Campo, Eun Mee Ahn, Helen Nightingale, Henry Gronnier, Jackie Brand, Josefina Vergara, Julie Rogers, Kathleen Sloan, Katia Popov, Lily Ho Chen, Natalie Leggett, Neel Hammond, Becky Bunnell, Richard Altenbach, Sarah Thornblade, Tiffany Yi Hu, Bruce Dukov
 Vocals (African choir) – Alvin Chea, Ayo Adeyemi, Baye Diouf, Terence Chaplin, Carmen Twillie, Darryl Phinnessee, Dethie Diouf, Greg Clark, Ibrahima Ba, Jim Gilstrap, Joel Virgel, Jules Green, Louis King, Marc Antonio Pritchett, Oren Waters, Rocky Dawuni, Thiane Diouf, Will Wheaton
 Woodwind – Pedro Eustache
 Orchestra
 Orchestra – The Hollywood Studio Symphony
 Orchestration – James Shearman, Patrick Doyle, Bruce Fowler
 Concertmaster – Belinda Broughton
 Conductor – James Shearman
 Stage engineer – Denis St. Amand
 Management
 Business affairs – Tom Cavanaugh
 Executive in charge of music – Robert Kraft
 Music production supervisor – Rebecca Morellato
 Stage manager – Greg Dennen, Tom Steel

References 

2011 soundtrack albums
Varèse Sarabande soundtracks
Patrick Doyle soundtracks
Planet of the Apes
Film scores